Nan Dieter-Conklin (1926 – November 16, 2014), also known as Nannielou Reier Hepburn Dieter Conklin, was an American radio astronomer.

Early life 
Nannielou Reier was born in Springfield, Illinois, the daughter of Paul G. Reier. She attended Goucher College to study mathematics, but an astronomy course taught by Helen Dodson sparked her interest in that subject. Dieter spent summer internships at the Maria Mitchell Observatory, working under Margaret Harwood. She completed doctoral studies at Radcliffe College in 1958, using her own radio astronomy data in her dissertation on Galaxy M33. Her research involved the radio telescope at Harvard, and she took a Harvard course on variable stars from Cecilia Payne-Gaposchkin. Astronomers Frank Drake and May Kaftan-Kassim were in Dieter's astronomy cohort at Harvard.

Career 
After college Nan Dieter worked for the U.S. Coast and Geodetic Survey. She was hired by the Naval Research Laboratory when they acquired a radio telescope. She published radio astronomy research on solar flares beginning in 1952, and is credited as "the first US woman radio astronomer" based on that work (Ruby Payne-Scott, an Australian, is recognized as the first woman radio astronomer). During her graduate work in Massachusetts, she was on the staff of the Air Force Cambridge Research Laboratories at Hanscom Field. In 1965, having completed her doctorate, she joined the staff of the Radio Astronomy Laboratory at the University of California, Berkeley.

Dieter-Conklin retired from Berkeley for health reasons in 1977, but continued to research and publish as she was able. Her last scholarly articles, all concerning the composition of interstellar clouds, were published in 2009, 2010, and 2014. She also published a memoir, Two Paths to Heaven's Gate, in 2006.

She was interviewed and photographed along with Vera Rubin and Paris Pişmiş as women astronomers attending the American Astronomical Society conference in Arizona in 1963. In 1964 she won the first Patricia Kayes Glass Award, at the Air Force Science and Engineering Symposium held at Brooks Air Force Base in Texas. She gave an oral history interview at Berkeley in 1977, looking back on her education and career.

Personal life 
Nan Dieter-Conklin was married to W. Peters Hepburn Jr. from 1950 to 1953, and to fellow scientist Carlisle L. Dieter. She had two daughters, born in 1951 (Amy Hepburn) and 1958 (Aleemna K Wraye). She was diagnosed with multiple sclerosis in 1960. She married her third husband, Garret Conklin, in 1968; she was widowed when he died in 2002. She died in Seattle in 2014, aged 88 years.

References

External links 

 Oral history interview transcript with Nan Dieter-Conklin on 19 July 1977, American Institute of Physics, Niels Bohr Library & Archives
 A photograph of Nan Dieter-Conklin, on Flickr.
Obituary of Nannielou Reier Hepburn Dieter Conklin (1926 - 2014), American Astronomical Society.

1926 births
2014 deaths
People from Springfield, Illinois
American women astronomers
Radio astronomers
People with multiple sclerosis
Goucher College alumni
Radcliffe College alumni
University of California, Berkeley faculty
20th-century  American astronomers
21st-century  American astronomers
20th-century American women scientists
21st-century American women scientists